Diana Del Bufalo (born 8 February 1990) is an Italian actress, singer, and television host.

Biography 
Diana Del Bufalo was born in Rome on the 8th of February 1990, her father is Dario Del Bufalo; an architect and archeologist and her mother is Ornella Pratesi, a soprano. Diana also has an older brother called Giano. In 2010 she participated as a singer in the talent show Amici di Maria de Filippi. Her elimination caused Platinette, a judge, to strip during the live broadcast to show his disagreement. During the show she recorded her first single "Nelle mie favole", featured in the music compilation of Amici 10. She has hosted Mai dire Amici, a comedy show developed by Gialappa's Band for Italian television channel Canale 5.

In the summer of 2011 she made her debut in cinema as the co-protagonist of the movie Matrimonio a Parigi directed by Massimo Boldi. Diana then went on to host Italian TV show Pianeta Mare broadcast on Rete 4. 
In the summer of 2013 she hosted Summer Festival on Canale 5. She then made her radio debut as a host for Radio LUISS in the broadcast Hit Chart. In 2014 she published online several songs produced by Francesco Arpino and performed weekly in the first season of television show XLove. In 2015 she hosted Italian TV show Colorado on Italia 1 alongside Paolo Ruffini. Between 2015 and 2016 she participated in Rai's television series C'era una volta Studio Uno, in the role of Rita. In 2017 she also participated in the fourth season of Rai's fiction Che Dio ci aiuti.

In 2017 she was a guest at the Sanremo Music Festival. In the same year she also hosted, alongside Giorgio Panariello, Panariello sotto l'albero On Rai 1. In March 2018 she starred in the comedy Puoi baciare lo sposo, directed by Alessandro Genovesi as well as in the movie La profezia dell'armadillo, based on the comic book by Zerocalcare. In 2019 she hosted Un'estate fa alongside singer Pupo on Rai 1. Del Bufalo is currently part of the cast of real-life thriller, Celebrity Hunted: Caccia all'uomo, produced by Endemol Shine Italy and broadcast on Prime Video where she is paired with Cristiano Caccamo. In 2020 she hosted alongside Diego Abatantuono Enjoy - Ridere fa bene on Rai 1. Between June 2020 and February 2021 she was involved in the filming of the sixth season of Che Dio ci aiuti, starring as Monica Giulietti.

Personal life 
After being in a relationship with singer Francesco Arpino, from 2015 to 2019 she was involved with actor and director Paolo Ruffini, whom she met during her time hosting television show Colorado. From 2019 until October 2020 she was in a relationship with Edoardo Tavassi.

Dubbing

Animated films 

  Encanto -Isabela Madrigal (2021)

Filmography

Films

Television

Radio 

 Hit Chart (Radio LUISS, 2011-2012)

Theater 

 La sposa cadavere (2016)
 "7 spose per 7 fratelli" (2022)

Events 

 Diversity Media Awards (2018)

Discography

Singles 

 2013 - Beep Beep (A Ha)
 2014 - La Foresta (Ce L'Ho Pelosa)
 2021 - Flashdance

Features 

 2010 - AA.VV. Amici 10, con il brano Nelle mie favole

Acknowledgements 

 CinéCiak d'Oro

 2018 - Rivelazione dell'anno

 Biglietto d'Oro

 2019 - Chiavi d'oro del successo for 10 giorni senza mamma

References

External links 

  Wikiquote contiene citazioni di o su Diana Del Bufalo
  Wikimedia Commons contiene immagini o altri file su Diana Del Bufalo

1990 births
Living people
Actresses from Rome
Singers from Rome
Mass media people from Rome
Italian television actresses
Italian film actresses
Italian women television presenters
21st-century Italian women singers
21st-century Italian actresses